Jabb Love Hua (International Title: Love Happens) is a Hindi serial that aired on Zee TV from 24 April 2006 to 12 July 2007. It starred Sudeep Sahir and Priya Badlani in the main roles.

Plot
The show starts with Aanya Shroff (Priya Badlani), a girl born with silver spoon in her mouth, accidentally making an undesirable wish and her whole family gets in trouble and run from the town and they end into a village where Raghu (Sudeep Sahir), a villager boy lived. When Aanya encounters Raghu, both are disappointed by each other's behaviour and end up fighting. But gradually both start falling for the other and their fights become the string that attach each other. Bhola (Rahul Lohani), Raghu's best friend fall in love with Isha, Aanya's sister who is jealous of Aanya. The series depict their love story as a city girl falls for a villager and she accepts the village lifestyle.

It was produced by DJ's A Creative Unit producers Deeya and Tony Singh, who shot to fame with their show 'Banegi Apni Baat' on Zee TV and Jassi Jaisi Koi Nahi on Sony TV.

Cast
 Sudeep Sahir as Raghu
 Priya Badlani as Aanya Shroff
 Manish Raisinghan as Arjun
 Suhasini Mulay as Geetanjali Devi (GD) Shroff
 Pratima Kazmi as Sumitra Devi
 Rameshwari as Jaanki Devi
 Karan Shah as Kishan Shroff
 Meher Acharya as Debbie Shroff
 Madhur Somanghamani / Monaz Mevawala as Isha Shroff
 Sunita Rajwar as Dacoit Leader
 Vivek Vaswani as Percy
 Abhileen Pandey as Chotu
 Vijay Kashyap as Sarpanch
 Yamini Singh as Yashoda
 Aamir Dalvi as Lakhan
 Shalini Khanna as Gehna
 Rahul Lohani as Bhola
 Atul Shrivastav as Rangeela
 Amardeep Jha as Kaushalya
 Himanshi Chaudhary as Basanti
 Poonam Gulati as Kangana
 Abir Goswami as Inspector Bali Shukla
 Mohit Malik as Rahul Mittal
 Neelu Kohli as Cameo Appearance

References

External links
Jabb Love Hua Official Site

2006 Indian television series debuts
2007 Indian television series endings
Zee TV original programming